KBRG (100.3 FM Amor 100.3) is a commercial radio station licensed to San Jose, California, with a Spanish AC radio format. The station is owned by TelevisaUnivision. Its studios are located at 1940 Zanker Road in San Jose, and the transmitter is on Loma Prieta Peak on the Santa Clara/Santa Cruz County line.

History

KEEN-FM and KBAY

KEEN-FM came to air March 4, 1963, after rushing to meet FCC deadlines and fix issues with its problematic transmitter. It was owned by United Broadcasting as the FM counterpart to KEEN AM 1370, but it offered easy listening music instead of KEEN's characteristic country format.

In 1967, KEEN-FM became KBAY, an easy listening station that remained as such for decades. In the early 1980s, it moved toward a soft adult contemporary sound.

KBRG comes to 100.3

In 1997, the Snell family, owners of United Broadcasting, sold their holdings. The buyer for KBAY was American Radio Systems. American Radio Systems immediately swapped with EXCL Communications, a subsidiary of Latin Communications Group. EXCL traded the Fremont-based KBRG facility at 104.9, an FM station in Portland, $2 million in cash and 150,000 shares of Latin Communications Group stock for the KBAY facility and Sacramento's KSSJ. ARS kept the KBAY call letters and format, which became part of a three-way station swap on December 31, 1997. KBAY moved from 100.3 to Gilroy 94.5, the former KUFX, while KUFX briefly moved to 104.9 before changing again in 1998.

KBRG history

KBRG was the Bay Area's first Spanish-language FM station, debuting in 1964 at 105.3 FM (now KITS). In December 1983, it moved to 104.9 (now KXSC) before being part of the ARS/EXCL swap on December 31, 1997.

From 1968 through 1971, KBRG broadcast Oakland Athletics games, with Víctor Manuel Torres at the mike.

In 1989, EXCL Communications purchased KBRG (previously on 104.9) from Radio America, Inc. EXCL brought the Radio Romántica Spanish AC format to 100.3 after moving from 104.9. During the 1990s, EXCL adapted the Radio Romántica format to several western Hispanic radio markets. After EXCL was acquired by Entravision in 2000, Entravision began to phase out the format. KBRG was the last station using the Radio Romántica format after Univision purchased KBRG from Entravision on January 1, 2006 and switched it to Spanish Adult Hits under the name Recuerdo 100.3.

On February 6, 2018, Univision dropped the "Más Variedad" Spanish Adult Hits format and switched it to Spanish AC as Amor 100.3. Although the music and radio shows are syndicated and heard from KOMR in Phoenix and KRDA in Fresno simultaneously, which also carries the Amor format. The “Amor” stations are similar to KLVE in Los Angeles which is one of the most listened Spanish language radio stations in the United States.

In March 2019, Univision placed all their stations into their new Uforia Audio Network, The station joined Uforia on March 15.

HD radio
KBRG Broadcasts in HD and has the following stations:
HD1 Amor 100.3
HD2 TUDN Radio

References

External links

List of "Superpower" Grandfathered FM radio stations
A different way of looking at superpower FM
FCC History Cards for KBRG

BRG
BRG
Univision Radio Network stations
Radio stations established in 1963
1963 establishments in California
Mainstream adult contemporary radio stations in the United States
Mass media in San Jose, California